The 2001 TAC Cup season was the 10th season of the TAC Cup competition. Calder Cannons have won there 1st premiership title after defeating the Bendigo Pioneers in the grand final by a 37 points.

Ladder

Grand Final

References 

NAB League
Nab League